AHA Gafur Chowdhury is a Jatiya Party politician and the former Member of Parliament of Cox's Bazar-4 in 1986.

Career 
Chowdhury was elected to parliament from Cox's Bazar-4 as a Jatiya Party candidate in 1986 Bangladeshi general election.

References 

Living people
People from Cox's Bazar District
Jatiya Party politicians
3rd Jatiya Sangsad members
Year of birth missing (living people)